Elections to the Australian Capital Territory Legislative Assembly occurred on Saturday, 20 October 2012. The 11-year incumbent Labor Party, led by Chief Minister Katy Gallagher, won a fourth term over the main opposition Liberal Party, led by opposition leader Zed Seselja.

Candidates are elected to fill all 17 Legislative Assembly seats in the unicameral parliament which consists of three multi-member electorates, Brindabella (five seats), Ginninderra (five seats) and Molonglo (seven seats), using a proportional representation single transferable vote method known as the Hare-Clark system. The election was conducted by the ACT Electoral Commission.

Key dates
 Last day to lodge applications for party register: 30 June 2012
 Party registration closed: 13 September 2012
 Pre-election period commenced and nominations opened: 14 September 2012
 Rolls closed: 21 September 2012
 Nominations closed: 26 September 2012
 Nominations declared and ballot paper order determined: 27 September 2012
 Pre-poll voting commenced: 2 October 2012
 Polling day, between the hours of 8 am and 6 pm: 20 October 2012

Background
The incumbent Labor Party led by Chief Minister Katy Gallagher attempted to win re-election for a historic fourth term after 11 years in government in the 17-member unicameral ACT Legislative Assembly. Labor, led by Jon Stanhope, formed a minority government after the 2008 election, with Greens holding the balance of power – Labor 7 seats (37.4%), Liberal 6 seats (31.6%), Greens 4 seats (15.6%). Stanhope resigned as Chief Minister and Labor leader on 12 May 2011, and was replaced by his deputy, Katy Gallagher.

All members of the unicameral Assembly faced re-election, with members being elected by the Hare-Clark system of proportional representation. The Assembly is divided into three electorates: five-member Brindabella (including Tuggeranong and parts of the Woden Valley) and Ginninderra (including Belconnen and suburbs) and seven-member Molonglo (including North Canberra, South Canberra, Gungahlin, Weston Creek, and the remainder of the Woden Valley). Election dates are set in statute with four-year fixed terms.

Candidates

Nine political parties were registered with the ACT Electoral Office as eligible for the October 2012 election. 
 Australian Labor Party (ACT Branch)
 Australian Motorist Party
 Bullet Train for Canberra	
 Liberal Democratic Party
 Marion Lê Social Justice Party	
 Liberal Party of Australia (A.C.T. Division) (Canberra Liberals)
 Pangallo Independents Party
 The ACT Greens
 The Community Alliance Party (ACT)

Three further organisations—Pirate Party Australia, Australian Democrats and No Carbon Tax Climate Sceptics—were not registered as political parties in the ACT, however had stated they intended to nominate candidates to be listed on ballot papers as independents.

Retiring members

Labor
 John Hargreaves (Brindabella)

Brindabella
Five seats were up for election. The Labor Party was defending two seats. The Liberal Party was defending two seats. The Greens were defending one seat.

Ginninderra
Five seats were up for election. The Labor Party was defending two seats. The Liberal Party was defending two seats. The Greens were defending one seat.

Molonglo
Seven seats were up for election. The Labor Party was defending three seats. The Liberal Party was defending two seats. The Greens were defending two seats.

Elected in this election were 3 Labour (Barr, Corbell, Gallagher), 2 Liberals (Doszpot, Hanson), and two Greens (Le Coutour, Rattenbury)

Unregistered parties and groups
Pirate Party Australia endorsed Mark Gibbons in Brindabella, Glen Takkenberg in Ginninderra, and Stuart Biggs in Molonglo.

Opinion polling
On 18 October 2012, 1,200 voters (400 voters per seat, 5% MoE) were polled by Patterson Research Group and published in The Canberra Times. Labor was on 44.5 percent (+7.1 points), the Liberals were on 35.5 percent (+3.9 points), the Greens were on 14.5 (−1.0 point) while others were on 5.5 percent (−9.9 points). This would have produced a result somewhere from minority government to majority government for the incumbent Labor government. It was the only poll conducted during the election campaign.

Results

Territory-wide vote 

|}

Primary vote by electorate

Final distribution of seats

Formation of Government 
After the distribution of preferences neither of the two major parties had won sufficient number of seats to form government in their own right and would need the support of the sole Greens representative Shane Rattenbury. While Labor leader Katy Gallagher wanted to renew the cooperation with the Greens from the previous election period, Liberal leader Zed Seselja argued that in the light of the overall losses of the previous Labor-Green alliance, the strong Liberal gain of 7.3%, and a historic tie in both seats and percentage (38.9% for each major party), with his party having received 41 more preference votes than Labor, the Liberals as the formally strongest party should lead the new Government.

After a week of negotiations with both major parties, Shane Rattenburry came to a formal agreement with the Labor Party to form a Coalition Government, which meant that he would be appointed to the cabinet, and implement nearly 100 policies and reforms mainly regarding the rail network in Canberra, the clean up of Canberra's lakes, the ACT's climate change targets, the Gonski education reforms and the reduction of homelessness. Despite "constructive conversations" with the Liberals Rattenbury justified the decision with the greater closeness between the two parties' policies, which would allow a "stable government", Gallagher's "more substantial agenda" and the Liberals' perceived irresponsibility towards progressive tax reforms. Another reason discussed by the press was that Seselja did not want to give a minister post to Rattenbury. As a result of Rattenbury's promotion to the cabinet, Gallagher planned to enlarge the cabinet to six ministers.

On 6 November 2012, Gallagher was re-elected as chief minister with the votes of her Labor-Green coalition. Labor's candidate for the office of Speaker Mary Porter, as expected, was not successful, as Rattenbury had announced at the same time as the government agreement that he would vote for the Liberal Party's candidate, which in the end was Vicki Dunne. Porter was elected Deputy Speaker instead. While both Chief Minister Katy Gallagher and Opposition Leader Zed Seselja retained their positions following the outcome of this election, neither lasted in their positions to lead their respective parties at the next election in 2016 as both remarkably resigned from their positions of their own volitions and from the territory Parliament to move to the Federal Parliament as the two senators representing the ACT.

Newspaper endorsements

See also
 2008 Australian Capital Territory general election
 2016 Australian Capital Territory general election
 Members of the Australian Capital Territory Legislative Assembly, 2008–2012
 Members of the Australian Capital Territory Legislative Assembly, 2012–2016

References

External links
2012 ACT election morning after results review: Antony Green ABC
ACT 2012 election homepage: Antony Green ABC

2012 elections in Australia
Elections in the Australian Capital Territory
October 2012 events in Australia
2010s in the Australian Capital Territory